Joseph Michael Kerrigan (16 December 1884 – 29 April 1964) was an Irish actor.

Early life
Joseph Michael Kerrigan was born on 16 December 1884 in Dublin, which was part of the United Kingdom of Great Britain and Ireland at that time. He studied at Belvedere College and worked as a newspaperman.

Career
The In 1907, Kerrigan joined the Irish National Theatre, later known as the Abbey Players. There he became a stalwart, appearing in plays by Lady Gregory, William Butler Yeats and John Millington Synge (for whom he created the role of Shawn Keogh in The Playboy of the Western World). He toured with the company to New York City in 1908 and again in 1911, when their American premiere of The Playboy of the Western World met with riotous disapproval.  By the 1920s he was appearing on Broadway, often in plays by Shakespeare, Ibsen, and Sheridan.  In 1924, he and Abbey colleague Dudley Digges appeared in Sutton Vane's Outward Bound, along with Alfred Lunt, Leslie Howard, Margalo Gillmore, and Beryl Mercer. All in all, he played in 35 Broadway productions in his career.

His first screen appearance was in Food of Love, one of six silent films he did in 1916. He settled permanently in Hollywood in 1935, having been recruited along with several other Abbey performers to appear in John Ford's The Informer. In this film and in Ford's The Long Voyage Home, he played similar roles, that of a leech who attaches himself to men until they run out of money. Perhaps his best-known role was in The General Died at Dawn, wherein he plays a character  named Leach, a sinister thief who, holding a gun on Cooper, says: "I may be fat, but I'm agile."

He had little screen time in films in which he had minor roles, such as the First Drayman in Merely Mary Ann (1931) with Janet Gaynor. One of his more recognizable roles was in Gone with the Wind (1939), in which he played John Gallegher, the seemly jovial mill owner who whips his convict labor into "co-operation". He appeared in Walt Disney's 20,000 Leagues Under the Sea (1954), the film version of Jules Verne's novel, in a minor role at the beginning of the film.

In a 1946 attempt to reach Broadway, the show Barnaby and Mr. O'Malley, based on the Crockett Johnson comic strip and starring Kerrigan as the discombobulated leprechaun Jackeen J. O'Malley, was unsuccessful.  Kerrigan made his final Broadway appearance later that year, however, in Guthrie McClintic's revival of The Playboy of the Western World, this time playing Michael James Flaherty. Over his career, he had roles in 114 short and feature-length motion pictures, and between 1952 and 1960 he appeared in episodes of 15 different TV series.

Kerrigan died in Hollywood on 29 April 1964, aged 79. He has a star on the Hollywood Walk of Fame at 6621 Hollywood Blvd.

Partial filmography

Little Old New York (1923) - John O'Day (film debut)
 Lucky in Love (1929) - Connors
New Movietone Follies of 1930 (1930) - Gateman in Show (uncredited)
Song o' My Heart (1930) - Peter
Just Imagine (1930) - Traffic Policeman in 1980 (uncredited)
Lightnin' (1930) - Judge Lemuel Townsend
Under Suspicion (1930) - Doyle
Don't Bet on Women (1931) - Chipley Duff
The Black Camel (1931) - Thomas MacMasters
Merely Mary Ann (1931) - First Drayman
The Rainbow Trail (1932) - Paddy Harrigan
Careless Lady (1932) - Trowbridge
State's Attorney (1932) - Coachman (uncredited)
 Vanity Street (1932) - Dan - Irish Cop (uncredited)
Rockabye (1932) - Fagin
The Monkey's Paw (1933) - Cpl. O'Leary (uncredited)
Air Hostess (1933) - Pop Kearny
A Study in Scarlet (1933) - Jabez Wilson
Paddy the Next Best Thing (1933) - Collins
Lone Cowboy (1933) - Mr. Curran
The Lost Patrol (1934) - Quincannon
A Modern Hero (1934) - Mr. Ryan
The Key (1934) - O'Duffy
Treasure Island (1934) - Tom Morgan - Pirate (uncredited)
The Fountain (1934) - Shordley
Happiness Ahead (1934) - Window Washer Boss
The Mystery of Edwin Drood (1935) - Chief Verger Tope
Vanessa: Her Love Story (1935) - Perkins (uncredited)
The Informer (1935) - Terry
Werewolf of London (1935) - Hawkins
The Farmer Takes a Wife (1935) - Angus (uncredited)
Hot Tip (1935) - Matt
Barbary Coast (1935) - Judge Harper
A Feather in Her Hat (1935) - Pobjoy
Timothy's Quest (1936) - Dr. Cudd
The Prisoner of Shark Island (1936) - Judge Maiben
Laughing Irish Eyes (1936) - Tim
Colleen (1936) - Pop Reilly
Special Investigator (1936) - Judge Plumgate
Hearts in Bondage (1936) - Paddy Callahan
Spendthrift (1936) - Pop O'Connell
The General Died at Dawn (1936) - Leach
Lloyd's of London (1936) - Brook Watson
Let's Make a Million (1936) - Sam Smith
The Plough and the Stars (1936) - Uncle Peter
The Barrier (1937) - Sergeant Thomas
Motor Madness (1937) - Henry John 'Cap' McNeil
London by Night (1937) - Tims
Vacation from Love (1938) - Danny Dolan, Hansom Cabbie
Spring Madness (1938) - Mr. Maloney (uncredited)
Little Orphan Annie (1938) - Tom Jennings
Ride a Crooked Mile (1938) - Sgt. Flynn
The Great Man Votes (1939) - Hot Shot Gillings
Boy Slaves (1939) - Brakeman (uncredited)
The Flying Irishman (1939) - Mr. Clyde Corrigan Sr.
The Kid from Texas (1939) - Farr
Undercover Agent (1939) - Tom 'Pop' Madison
Union Pacific (1939) - Monahan
Sorority House (1939) - Lew Fisher
The Zero Hour (1939) - Timothy
6,000 Enemies (1939) - Dan Barrett
Two Bright Boys (1939) - Mike Casey
The Witness Vanishes (1939) - Flinters
Sabotage (1939) - Mel
Two Thoroughbreds (1939) - Jack Lenihan
Gone with the Wind (1939) - Johnny Gallagher
Congo Maisie (1940) - Captain Finch
Young Tom Edison (1940) - Mr. McCarney
Three Cheers for the Irish (1940) - Scanlon
Curtain Call (1940) - Mr. Middleton
The Sea Hawk (1940) - Eli Matson
Untamed (1940) - Angus McGavity
One Crowded Night (1940) - Joseph
No Time for Comedy (1940) - Jim
The Long Voyage Home (1940) - Crimp
Adventure in Washington (1941) - Jim O'Brien
Appointment for Love (1941) - Timothy
The Wolf Man (1941) - Charles Conliffe
The Vanishing Virginian (1942) - John Phelps
Captains of the Clouds (1942) - Foster
Action in the North Atlantic (1943) - Caviar Jinks (uncredited)
Mr. Lucky (1943) - Mr. McDougal (uncredited)
The Fighting Seabees (1944) - Sawyer Collins
Wilson (1944) - Edward Sullivan
An American Romance (1944) - Charlie O'Rourke - Steam Shovel Operator (uncredited)
The Big Bonanza (1944) - Judge Jasper Kincaid
Tarzan and the Amazons (1945) - Splivens
The Great John L. (1945) - Father O'Malley
Crime Doctor's Warning (1945) - Robert MacPherson (uncredited)
The Spanish Main (1945) - Pillery Gow
She Went to the Races (1945) - Jeff Habbard
Black Beauty (1946) - John
Abie's Irish Rose (1946) - Patrick Murphy
Call Northside 777 (1948) - Sullivan - Court Bailiff (uncredited)
The Luck of the Irish (1948) - Tatie the Innkeeper
The Fighting O'Flynn (1949) - Timothy
Mrs. Mike (1949) - Uncle John
Double Crossbones (1951) - Debtor (uncredited)
Sealed Cargo (1951) - Skipper Ben
Two of a Kind (1951) - Father Lanahan (uncredited)
The Wild North (1952) - Callahan
Park Row (1952) - Dan O'Rourke
My Cousin Rachel (1952) - Reverend Pascoe
The Silver Whip (1953) - Riley
20,000 Leagues Under the Sea (1954) - Old Billy
It's a Dog's Life (1955) - Paddy Corbin
The Fastest Gun Alive (1956) - Kevin McGovern (final film)
Shirley Temple's Storybook (1958, TV) - The Magic Fishbone 
Tales of Wells Fargo (1959, TV) - Smalley 
Wagon Train (1959, TV) - John Reed 
The Loretta Young Show (1960, TV) - Mr. Thomas J. Flaherty 
Lock-Up (1960, TV) - Professor Caldwell (last appearance)

References

External links

 

Irish male film actors
20th-century Irish male actors
Male actors from Dublin (city)
Male actors from Los Angeles
Burials at Holy Cross Cemetery, Culver City
1884 births
1964 deaths
Irish expatriate male actors in the United States
People educated at Belvedere College